Jonathan Igbinovia (born 27 December 1980) is a Nigerian former professional tennis player.

A native of Lagos, Igbinovia had a best singles world ranking of 461 and competed for the Nigeria Davis Cup team from 1998 to 2007, registering 31 overall wins. In 2003 he partnered with Sunday Maku to win a silver medal in doubles at the All-Africa Games in Abuja. He played collegiate tennis early in his career, for Georgia Perimeter College.

Igbinovia is also a musician under the name JayAfrotone and says he has invented his own genre of music called "Afrotone", which he describes as a mix of mainstream music and African sounds.

ITF Futures finals

Singles: 3 (1–2)

Doubles: 9 (4–5)

References

External links
 
 
 

1980 births
Living people
Nigerian male tennis players
Perimeter College at Georgia State University alumni
African Games medalists in tennis
African Games silver medalists for Nigeria
Competitors at the 2003 All-Africa Games
Sportspeople from Lagos